Lloyd Earl Burruss Jr. (born October 31, 1957 in Charlottesville, Virginia) is a former American football safety who played for the Kansas City Chiefs from 1981 to 1991 in the National Football League. He is the only Chief to ever be the Mack Lee Hill Award winner (1981), the team's MVP (1985) and a member of the Chiefs Hall of Fame (1999).

Of his 22 interceptions, 4 of them went for touchdowns. he also scored a touchdown via fumble recovery. During the 1980s, Burruss average 63 tackles per season

External links
Profile at kcchiefs.com
NFL.com player page

1957 births
Living people
Sportspeople from Charlottesville, Virginia
American football safeties
Maryland Terrapins football players
Kansas City Chiefs players
American Conference Pro Bowl players
Ed Block Courage Award recipients